John R. Phillips may refer to:
John R. Phillips (attorney) (born 1942), American diplomat and attorney
John R. Phillips (American politician), Republican United States Congressman from California, 1943–1957

See also
John Phillips (disambiguation)